The Southern Hotel, at 101 S. Fifth St. in Dolores, Colorado, was built in 1893.  It was listed on the National Register of Historic Places in 1989.  It has also been known as Benny's Hogan and as the Rio Grande Southern Hotel.

References

		
National Register of Historic Places in Montezuma County, Colorado
Queen Anne architecture in Colorado
Hotel buildings completed in 1893
Hotels in Colorado